Texas Rangers most commonly refers to:
 Texas Ranger Division of the Texas Department of Public Safety, commonly called the Texas Rangers
 Texas Rangers (baseball), a Major League Baseball team

Texas Rangers may also refer to:

Sports
 Texas City Rangers, a team of the American Basketball Association which began in 2008

Police and military
 Hays's Texas Rangers, the popular name of the 1st Regiment of Texas Mounted Rifle Volunteers in the early MexicanAmerican War
 Terry's Texas Rangers, the popular name of the 8th Texas Cavalry
 Terry's Texas Rangers, a modern regiment in the Texas State Guard

Entertainment
 Texas Rangers (film), a 2001 film directed by Steve Miner
 The Texas Rangers (1936 film), a 1936 film directed by King Vidor
 The Texas Rangers (1951 film), a 1951 Western directed by Phil Karlson
 The Texas Ranger, a 1931 film
 Tales of the Texas Rangers, 1950s radio and television series
 Walker, Texas Ranger, a TV series starring Chuck Norris
 The Texas Ranger (magazine), published at the University of Texas at Austin from 1923 to 1972

Other
 Texas Rangers (architects), a group of architects at the University of Texas at Austin
 Leucophyllum frutescens, an evergreen shrub sometimes referred to as "Texas Ranger"

See also
Ranger, Texas
Ranger (disambiguation)